The Herveo plump toad (Osornophryne percrassa) is a species of toad in the family Bufonidae. It is endemic to the Cordillera Central in the Antioquia, Caldas, Quindío, and Tolima Departments, Colombia.

Description
Osornophryne percrassa are relatively small toads: males measure  and females  in snout–vent length. It differs from other Osornophryne by its truncated snout in lateral view, with a little non-projected papilla at the end, and by its light spots on the belly.

Habitat and conservation
Its natural habitats are Andean forests and páramos at elevations of  asl. It is a ground-dwelling species found among leaf-litter and rocks, or in terrestrial and arboreal bromeliads. Development is direct. It is an uncommon species threatened by habitat loss and fragmentation, mainly from agriculture, and by pollution from the fumigation of illegal crops. Climate change might also pose a threat. The species is known from a number of protected areas.

References

Osornophryne
Amphibians of Colombia
Amphibians of the Andes
Endemic fauna of Colombia
Amphibians described in 1976
Taxonomy articles created by Polbot